Eddy Roberts was the 1973 leading scorer in the American Soccer League.  Roberts played for the Cincinnati Comets, scoring twelve goals, and adding ten assists, in twelve games as the Comets finished runner-up to the New York Apollo.

References

American Soccer League (1933–1983) players
Cincinnati Comets players
Year of birth missing (living people)
Living people
American soccer players
Association footballers not categorized by position